Shahroud International Airport  is an international airport located in Shahroud, Semnan Province, Iran. It is the largest airport  of the Semnan province.

Airlines and destinations

References

Airports in Iran
Shahrud County
Semnan Province
Buildings and structures in Semnan Province
Transportation in Semnan Province